Eoropie is the most northerly village on the Isle of Lewis in the parish of Ness, in the Outer Hebrides, Scotland. Eoropie is within the parish of Barvas. The Teampull Mholuaidh is to be found here. Eoropie is situated at the end of the B8013 and B8014 roads, from Lionel and Port of Ness, respectively.

It is just south of the Butt of Lewis and contains the Eoropie Dunes Park.

Landmarks

Teampall Rònaidh/Rònain 
In Eoropie is Teampall Rònaidhb which are the remains of chapel that is a scheduled ancient monument and is believed to be the oldest church site in Northern Lewis.   Local tradition associations the site with the island of North Rona. It is sais that St Ronan was taken from Ness to North Rona on the back of a sea monster. It is said to have been built by a person named Rònaidh, who lived in it with his sister.

Teampall Mholuaidh 

Another historical church in Eoropie is Teampall  Mholuaidh (St Moluag's) which possibly dates from sometime between the 12th to 16th centuries. For a while it was roofless and being used as a shelter for sheep until it was restored in 1912 and is now a Scottish Episcopal Church. The church is traditionally considered to be the MacLeods’ church.

Europie Beach 
A wide sandy beach on the edge of Eoropie.

Eoropie Dunes Park 
This is a 4 acre play site. The Park is managed by a charity called Guth Airson Iarrtasan Nis (A Voice for the Needs of Ness).  Set up in 1998 “to enhance play and leisure facilities and encourage environmental awareness,” by a group of mothers who had no local playground for their children. The land was donated by the crofting families who traditionally worked the sandy 'machair' land along the west coast of Lewis.

References

External links

Cannmore - Lewis, Eoropie site record

Villages in the Isle of Lewis